The R186 road is a regional road in Ireland linking Monaghan in County Monaghan and the Republic of Ireland–United Kingdom border. The road passes through the village of Tydavnet.

See also 

 Roads in Ireland
 National primary road
 National secondary road

References 

Regional roads in the Republic of Ireland
Roads in County Monaghan